Little Rock City Hall, the seat of municipal government of the city of Little Rock, Arkansas, is located at 500 West Markham Street, in the city's downtown.  It is a Renaissance Revival structure, designed by Arkansas architect Charles L. Thompson and built in 1907.  Its main facade has a projecting Roman portico, supported by fluted Ionic columns, with flanking sections that have Roman-style round-arch openings.  The building housed most of the city's departments until the 1950s.

The building was listed on the National Register of Historic Places in 1979.

See also
National Register of Historic Places listings in Little Rock, Arkansas

References

City and town halls on the National Register of Historic Places in Arkansas
Renaissance Revival architecture in Arkansas
Government buildings completed in 1907
Buildings and structures in Little Rock, Arkansas
City halls in Arkansas
National Register of Historic Places in Little Rock, Arkansas